To Mother is the first EP by American punk band Babes in Toyland, released July 1, 1991 by Twin/Tone Records. It consists of outtakes from their previous release, Spanking Machine, which were re-recorded and produced by John Loder in London in 1990.

It was a commercial success in the United Kingdom, where it peaked at number 1 on the UK Indie Chart, remaining in the number 1 position for ten weeks.

Recording
The material on To Mother was recorded in 1990 by engineer and producer John Loder at his private home studio (Southern Studios) in the Wood Green area of London.

Artwork
A childhood photograph of Kat Bjelland's mother, Lynne Irene Higginbotham, appears on the album's cover. Bjelland's mother died of pancreatic cancer at the time of the EP's recording, which influenced the decision of both the artwork and the title.

Release
To Mother was released on vinyl in the United Kingdom by the independent label Southern Records, who at the time distributed Twin/Tone Records releases abroad. In the United States, Twin/Tone released the EP on July 1, 1991 on compact disc, cassette, as well as vinyl formats.

According to Twin/Tone's official catalogue, the album sold 1,260 vinyl copies, 1,792 cassettes, and 4,336 CDs before the band signed with Warner Bros.'s Reprise Records in 1992, with whom they released their breakthrough album, Fontanelle (1992). The EP entered the UK Indie Chart at number 1, and remained there for 13 weeks, 10 of which it held the number one position.

In 1993, the independent Australian label Insipid Records released "Catatonic" as a split-single with "Death, Agonies & Screams" by Poison Idea.

Critical response
Critic Steve Taylor called the EP "more varied" than their previous releases, "opening with the ranting 'Catatonic' and closing with the soothing 'Quiet Room.'" Rolling Stone awarded the album a two out of four-star rating in their 2004 album guide, while Robert Christgau gave it a "bomb" rating, the lowest in his rating classification system. John Dugan of AllMusic awarded the EP three out of five stars, noting that it is a "follow-up that's strong but not life-changing."

Track listing

Personnel
Kat Bjellandvocals, guitar
Michelle Leonbass
Lori Barberodrums, vocals

Chart positions

References

Works cited

Babes in Toyland (band) EPs
1991 EPs
Twin/Tone Records EPs